Let Us in Americana: The Music of Paul McCartney is a tribute album to musician Paul McCartney. Phil Madeira produced the album, released by Reviver Records in 2013. All the proceeds for the album were donated to the Women and Cancer Fund, a charity established in memory of Linda McCartney.

Track listing

References

Sources

 

2013 compilation albums
The Beatles tribute albums
Paul McCartney